The Claudia Kishi Club is a 2020 short documentary film directed by Sue Ding. The premise revolves around the director Sue Ding interviewing people about the character of Claudia Kishi, part of The Baby-Sitters Club, and her importance being a Japanese-American character.

The Claudia Kishi Club was released on July 10, 2020, on Netflix.

Cast 
 Naia Cucukov
 Gale Galligan
 Sarah Kuhn
 C. B. Lee
 Yumi Sakugawa
 Phil Yu

References

External links
 
 

2020 films
Netflix original documentary films
American short documentary films
The Baby-Sitters Club
2020 short documentary films
2020s English-language films
2020s American films